Esporte Clube São João da Barra, commonly known as São João da Barra, is a Brazilian football club based in São João da Barra, Rio de Janeiro state.

History
The club was founded on July 31, 2009. São João da Barra won the Campeonato Carioca Third level in 2010, after beating Barra Mansa in the final.

Achievements

 Campeonato Carioca Third level:
 Winners (1): 2010

Stadium
Esporte Clube São João da Barra play their home games at Estádio Municipal Manoel José Viana de Sá.

References

 
Association football clubs established in 2009
Football clubs in Rio de Janeiro (state)
2009 establishments in Brazil